Krustpils Parish is an administrative unit of Jēkabpils Municipality in the Latgale region of Latvia. Prior to the 2009 administrative reforms, it was part of the former Jēkabpils District. Parish administration is in Spuņģēni.

Towns, villages and settlements of Krustpils parish

References 

Parishes of Latvia
Jēkabpils Municipality
Latgale